Brian Meade is a Gaelic footballer who plays for the Meath county team.

Meade plays for Midfield position his local club Rathkenny and for Meath senior team since being called up in 2007 by former footballer and manager Colm Coyle.

References

Year of birth missing (living people)
Living people
Meath inter-county Gaelic footballers